Tropidion subcruciatum is a species of beetle in the family Cerambycidae. It was described by White in 1855.

References

Tropidion
Beetles described in 1855